Yuvraj Hans is an Indian Punjabi-language actor. He is the son of singer-turned politician and Bharatiya Janata Party MP Hans Raj Hans.

Personal life

His elder brother is Navraj Hans, who is also a singer and actor. Yuvraj married Mansi Sharma in February 2019. They had a baby boy Hredaan Yuvraj Hans in May 2020.

Acting career

Yuvraj has appeared in two Punjabi feature films. His acting debut was in Yaar Annmulle and was a success. Yaar Annmulle also starred Arya Babbar and Harish Verma. Yuvraj's portrayal of a shy and intelligent college student earned him the debut award at the 5th Punjabi Film Festival. This was followed by Buurraahh, in 2012, but was a failure at the box office.

Filmography
{| class="wikitable"
|-  style="background:#b0c4de; text-align:center;"
! Year !! Film !! Role !! Other notes
|-
| 2011 || Yaar Annmulle || Deep Sondhi || Debut Film
|-
| 2012 || Burrraahh || Jass || With Harish Verma
|-
| 2013 || Viyah 70 KM || || Special Appearance
|-
| 2013 || Young Malang || Jazz ||
|-
| 2014 || Mr & Mrs 420 || Paali ||
|-
| 2014 || Proper Patola || Yuvi || with Neeru Bajwa
|-
| 2015 || Yaarana || ||
|-
| 2015 || Munde Kamaal De || Rocky || an aphonic lover
|-
| 2016 || Canada Di Flight ||Jigar||
|-
| 2017 || Lahoriye || Naseem Khan || With Amrinder Gill
|-
| 2019 || Yaara Ve (film)|Yaara Ve || Neza || With Monica Gill
|-
| 2020 ||Jinde Meriye ||  || 
|-
| 2020 || style="background:#ffc;"|Yaar Anmulle Returns||  || 
|}

Musical career
On 23 December 2015, he released his first album, "Yuvraj", which features nine songs including "Paani". Yuvraj Hans has also sang on the soundtracks of several Punjabi movies. He started his singing career with the song "Tere Naina", featured in the Punjabi movie Pinky Moge Wali. He sang "Saiyaan" in Burraahh''. His new album will be releasing on 10 July 2016 is "Dil Di Kasoor".

References

Punjabi-language lyricists
Male actors from Punjab, India
Living people
Year of birth missing (living people)
People from Jalandhar
Male actors in Punjabi cinema
21st-century Indian male actors